Lolita No.18 (ロリータ18号) is a Japanese all-girl punk rock band formed in 1989, known for their cartoony, high-pitched vocals.

Members
Masayo Ishizaka (石坂マサヨ) - vocals (1989-)

Former members
Kim*Rin (キム☆リン) - original bassist (-2001)
Enazo (エナゾゥ) - original guitarist (-2001)
Aya Bow (アヤ坊 ) - drum & chorus (-2001)
TO-BU - drums (2007-2015)
Gorô (ゴロー) - second guitarist (-2005)
Tacchamen (タッチャメン) - guitar (2002-2009)
Light (ライト) - guitar (2009-2010)
Kick - guitar (2010-2017)
Takochi (たこち) - bass (2002-2018)
Chi-chan - drums (2015-2018)

Discography
1995 - カラテの先生 (Karate Teacher)
1996 - 姉さん裸走り (Sister Run Naked)
1997 - 髭忍者 (Hige-Ninja)
1998 - 父母�NY (FUBO LOVE NY) produced by Joey Ramone
1999 - ヤリタミン (YALITAMIN)
1999 - TOY DOLL (produced by Olga of the Toy Dolls)
2000 - ロリータ18号ライブ1995-1996 (Lolita No.18 Live 1995-1996)
2000 - 副隊長 (fukutaichou)
2000 - TOY DOLL TOUR 2000
2000 - 鳥人間 (toriningen, released in UK as Angel of The North) produced by Olga of the Toy Dolls
2001 - THE GREAT ROCK'N'ROLL FESTIVAL!!
2002 - BEST OF LOLITA No.18
2003 - DESTROIN
2004 - LOLITA LET’S(ラ)GO!GO!!GO!!!
2005 - CHECK THE MARTEN
2005 - NUTS THE ANIMAL
2010 - アキラメルカ？ (AKIRAMERUKA?)
2012 - Yes, Punk Rock, Call With Me!!!
2016 - LOLITAAA！！！

See also
Sister Records
Shonen Knife
J-Rock

References

External links
Lolita No.18 at Sister Records (English)

All-female punk bands
Japanese punk rock groups